Stranda is a municipality in Møre og Romsdal county, Norway.

Stranda may also refer to:

Stranda, Møre og Romsdal, the administrative centre of Stranda Municipality
Stranda Hundred, a hundred of Småland in Sweden

See also

Stranda Fjord Trail Race